Persatuan Sepakbola Indonesia Laut Tawar Takengon (simply known as Persilatama Takengon) is an Indonesian football club based in Takengon, Central Aceh Regency, Aceh. They currently compete in the Liga 3 and their homeground is Musara Alun Stadium.

References

External links
Persilatama Takengon Instagram

Football clubs in Indonesia
Football clubs in Aceh
Association football clubs established in 2006
2006 establishments in Indonesia